Effi may refer to:

 Efraim Effi Birnbaum (born 1954), Israeli basketball coach
 Efraim Effi Eitam (born 1952), Israeli politician and retired brigadier-general
 Efraim Effi Wizen (born 1956), Israeli computer animator and visual effects specialist
 the title character of the 1896 novel Effi Briest and various film and television adaptations
 Effi (C++), an application development framework
 effi, a reporting bug & testing application for mobile QA
 Effie Awards - award given in some countries for effectiveness in marketing

See also
 Effie (disambiguation)
 Effy Stonem, a character in the television series Skins

Hypocorisms